Michael Craig Weisberg (born October 20, 1976) is an American philosopher of science, currently Bess W. Heyman President's Distinguished Professor and Chair of Philosophy at the University of Pennsylvania, where he also co-directs the Galápagos Education and Research Alliance. He is also Senior Faculty Fellow and Director of Postgraduate Programs for Perry World House and a Non-resident Senior Advisor for the International Peace Institute.

Education and career

Weisberg earned both a B.S. in chemistry and a B.A. in philosophy in 1999 from the University of California, San Diego, where he studied with Philip Kitcher.  He earned his Ph.D. in philosophy in 2003 at Stanford University under the supervision of Peter Godfrey-Smith.  He has taught at the University of Pennsylvania since 2003.

Weisberg is the editor-in-chief of the peer-reviewed journal Biology and Philosophy.

Philosophical work

Weiseberg is known for his research in philosophy of science, especially the relationship between idealization and the use of models in biology and chemistry, as well as his work in social ecology and global climate policy. He has also studied public understanding of science.

References

External links
Personal faculty website

Living people
1976 births
Academic journal editors
Philosophers of science
University of Pennsylvania faculty
Stanford University alumni
University of California, San Diego alumni
21st-century American philosophers